Jeremy Nixon  (born 1982)  is a Canadian politician who was elected in the 2019 Alberta general election to represent the electoral district of Calgary-Klein in the 30th Alberta Legislature.

Political career
After obtaining a Bachelor of Communications and Culture from the University of Calgary, Nixon spent 15 years working in the not-for-profit and government sector. He held leadership roles with the Boys & Girls Clubs of Calgary, the Mustard Seed, Canadian Mental Health Association and the City of Calgary.

Nixon ran for political office to give the vulnerable sector a voice in the Alberta Legislature. He sat on various Standing Committees including the Select Special Democratic Accountability Committee, the Standing Committee on Families and Communities, the Standing Committee on Legislative Offices and the Standing Committee on Private Bills and Private Members’ Public Bills.

In December 2020, Nixon traveled to Hawaii following the establishment of a "safe corridor" between Hawaii and Alberta. However, there was a provincial travel advisory in place, asking Albertans to avoid non-essential travel if possible. Faced with pressure from media, Nixon resigned from his position as parliamentary secretary.

On November 23, 2021, Nixon was appointed parliamentary secretary to the Minister of Community and Social Services for Civil Society.

Premier Danielle Smith said on October 21, 2022 Nixon would be promoted to cabinet as Minister of Seniors, Community and Social Services.

Since taking on the portfolio, Nixon has taken several initiatives to support Alberta's most vulnerable. Assured Income for the Severely Handicapped and the Alberta Seniors Benefit have been indexed to inflation, increases were given to front-line staff in the social sector, and affordable housing has been expanded. The province’s food banks are also receiving funding to address severe shortages of both food and volunteers. Nixon currently leads the Calgary Public Safety and Community Response Task Force aimed at finding solutions to the ongoing addictions and homelessness crises in the city.

Personal life
Nixon was born in Calgary, Alberta. His dad, Pat Nixon, is the founder of the Mustard Seed; a non-profit organization with a mission to eliminate homelessness and reduce poverty. He is the brother of Alberta MLA Jason Nixon. Nixon is married to Anita and together they have 4 children.

Electoral history

2019 general election

2015 general election

2012 general election

References

United Conservative Party MLAs
Living people
Politicians from Calgary
21st-century Canadian politicians
1982 births